Satish Chandra Roy is a Bangladesh Awami League politician and the former State Minister of Fisheries and Livestock and Minister of Primary and Mass Education. He is a member of Awami League presidium council.

References

Awami League politicians
Living people
Year of birth missing (living people)